Taichung City Hall is a metro station operated by Taichung Metro located in Xitun District, Taichung, Taiwan. It is on the Green Line. The planned Blue Line will intersect with the Green Line at this station.

Around the station
The station is located at the intersection of Taiwan Blvd and Wenxin Rd, two major thoroughfares of Taichung City. It serves the city's
"7th Redevelopment Zone", the commercial center of the city. Taichung City Hall, the station's namesake, is located nearby.

Two mixed-use buildings are being constructed to the east and west of the station.

Station layout

References 

Taichung Metro
Railway stations in Taichung
Railway stations opened in 2020